Katsdorf is a municipality in the district Perg in the Austrian state of Upper Austria.

Geography
Katsdorf lies in the Mühlviertel. About 11 percent of the municipality is forest, and 76 percent is farmland.

History

World War II
On May 5, 1945, Major General Holmes Ely Dager's 11th Armored Division captured Katsdorf. On August 1, 1945, Soviet troops took over.

References

Cities and towns in Perg District